Niuksenitia is an extinct genus of biarmosuchian therapsids from the Late Permian of Russia. It is only known from a partial skull including part of the posterior half of the skull and the palate. Because so little of it is known, it is difficult to determine the closest relatives of this species.

References

Burnetiamorphs
Prehistoric therapsid genera
Lopingian synapsids of Europe
Permian Russia
Fossils of Russia
Fossil taxa described in 1977
Taxa named by Leonid Petrovich Tatarinov